The men's shot put at the 1938 European Athletics Championships was held in Paris, France, at Stade Olympique de Colombes on 4 September 1938.

Medalists

Results

Final
4 September

Participation
According to an unofficial count, 12 athletes from 9 countries participated in the event.

References

Shot put
Shot put at the European Athletics Championships